The Governorate of New Andalusia was a Spanish Governorate of the Crown of Castile in South America which existed between 1534–1617.

History
The governorate was created as one of King Charles V's grants of 1534, establishing the adelantado Pedro de Mendoza as its first governor, captain general, and chief justice. The territory was described as extending 200 leagues down the Pacific coast from Diego de Almagro's grant of New Toledo, but was understood to involve the exploration, pacification, and settlement of the Río de la Plata along the Atlantic.

While in theory the Governorate of New Andalusia included all of present-day Uruguay and Paraguay and large segments of Chile, Argentina and Brazil, the adelantados were only able to effectively colonize the Paraná River, losing other territories to subsequent grants.

Disestablishment
After the establishment of the Viceroyalty of Peru in 1542, the Governorate of New Andalusia was replaced by the Governorate of the Río de la Plata, under the supervision of the Real Audiencia of Lima.

Governorates in Hispanic America
After the territorial division of South America between Spain and Portugal, the Peruvian Hispanic administration was divided into six entities: 
Province of Tierra Firme, included the Caribbean Coast, Central America, the Pacific Coast of Colombia and Mexico.
Governorate of New Castile, consisting of the territories from roughly the Ecuadorian-Colombian border in the north to Cuzco in the south.
Governorate of New Toledo, forming the previous southern half of the Inca empire, stretching towards central Chile.
Governorate of New Andalusia, which was not formally conquered by Spain until decades later.
Governorate of New León, the southernmost part of the continent until the Strait of Magellan.
Governorate of Terra Australis, territories from the south of the Strait of Magellan to the South Pole.

This territorial division set the basis for the Hispanic administration of South America for several decades. It was formally dissolved in 1544, when King Charles I sent his personal envoy, Blasco Núñez Vela, to govern the newly founded Viceroyalty of Peru that replaced the governorates.

See also
 Colonial Argentina
Governorate of New Andalusia (1501–13) — in the colonial Venezuela region.
 India Juliana
New Andalusia Province, or Province of Cumaná (1537–1864) — in the colonial Venezuela region.

References

Governorates of the Spanish Empire
Former colonies in South America
Former Spanish colonies
Former political divisions related to Argentina
Spanish colonization of the Americas
Colonial Argentina
Colonial Brazil

Colonial Peru
Colonial Uruguay
1530s in South America
1540s in South America
States and territories established in 1534
1534 establishments in South America
1534 establishments in the Spanish Empire
States and territories disestablished in 1549
1549 disestablishments in South America
1549 disestablishments in the Spanish Empire
History of South America